"Hear Me Calling" is a song by American rapper and singer Juice Wrld, released as a single on March 1, 2019. It was the second single from his album Death Race for Love. The song was produced by Purps. It was sent to Italy contemporary hit radio on 22 March 2019 through Universal and later sent to US rhythmic contemporary radio on April 9, 2019 The song was featured in the soundtrack of NBA 2K20.

Background and composition
Producer Purps from 808 Mafia states that he was aiming for a more "happy pop" sound when composing the tropical-influenced beat. After Purps played the beat by accident during a recording session, Juice was impressed by the beat and freestyled the lyrics to the song in 40 minutes. In an Instagram live, Higgin's then girlfriend Ally Lotti revealed that the song was made after she almost left him as the first verse alludes to that.

Music video
The video was released on March 11, 2019, and was directed by Bradley & Pablo. In a homage to PlayStation games such as Twisted Metal, Juice is shown rescuing his love interest from a speeding truck with video-game-style CGI graphics integrated with live action, complete with a simulated car chase.

Charts

Certifications

Release history

References

2019 singles
2019 songs
Juice Wrld songs
Songs written by Juice Wrld
Interscope Records singles